Ch'ŏlsan County is a kun, or county, in North P'yŏngan province, North Korea.  It occupies the Ch'ŏlsan Peninsula, which juts into the Yellow Sea. Ch'ŏlsan borders Yŏmju and Tongrim counties to the north, and is bounded on all other sides by water.
Ch'ŏlsan is home to the Sohae Satellite Launching Station.

Name
Ch'ŏlsan appears as Cheolsan in South Korea's Revised Romanization and as Tieshan in Chinese records, as during its occupation by Mao Wenlong during the Manchu conquest of China.

Geography
The terrain is dominated by rolling hills, seldom exceeding 300 m; the highest peak is Yŏndaesan at 393 m. The offshore island of Kado enjoys similar terrain, with Yondaebong reaching 335 m. There are a total of 28 offshore islands, some of which are uninhabited. The coastline measure 123 kilometres in length, or 265 km if the islands are also included.

Administrative divisions
Ch'ŏlsan county is divided into 1 ŭp (town), 2 rodongjagu (workers' districts) and 25 ri (villages):

Climate
Ch'ŏlsan enjoys a relatively mild maritime climate, with the warmest winters in North P'yŏngan.  The annual temperature is 8.9 °C, with a January average of -7.9 °C and an August average of 24 °C.  Annual rainfall is 900 mm.

Economy
46% of the county's land is occupied by forests, which are dominated by pine and oak.  40% is cultivated, with crops including rice, maize, and soybeans. Clams and fish are harvested from nearby waters.

Local tourist attractions include the Pansong archipelago, known for its scenery, and the Masŏn cavern (마선굴). The island of Wŏndo has been made into a nature preserve.

Educational institutions in Ch'ŏlsan include Ch'ŏlsan Advanced Technical School (철산고등전문학교).

See also
Geography of North Korea
Administrative divisions of North Korea
North Pyongan

References

External links

Counties of North Pyongan